Gary Alexander (born February 10, 1944) is an American wrestler. Alexander was in line to compete at the 1972 Summer Olympics, however he was shot in the jaw two months prior to the Games. Alexander would recover by the next Olympic Games, where he competed in the men's Greco-Roman 62 kg at the 1976 Summer Olympics.

References

External links
 

1944 births
Living people
American male sport wrestlers
Olympic wrestlers of the United States
Wrestlers at the 1976 Summer Olympics
Sportspeople from Minneapolis
Pan American Games medalists in wrestling
Pan American Games silver medalists for the United States
Wrestlers at the 1975 Pan American Games
Medalists at the 1975 Pan American Games